Andy Ramos  (born February 23, 1991) is a Cuban footballer.

Club career
He played for hometown team Matanzas, before moving to Canada to join NASL club FC Edmonton. LA Galaxy Major League Soccer [MLS] Miami Fusion FC  He moved to newly formed Miami Fusion in 2015.

International career
Ramos made his first and only appearance for the Cuba national team on October 16, 2012 in a World Cup qualifier against Panama.

References

External links

1991 births
Living people
Sportspeople from Matanzas
Association football goalkeepers
Cuban footballers
Cuba international footballers
Cuba youth international footballers
FC Matanzas players
Footballers at the 2011 Pan American Games
Pan American Games competitors for Cuba
Cuban expatriate footballers
Expatriate soccer players in Canada
Cuban expatriate sportspeople in Canada
Expatriate soccer players in the United States
Cuban expatriate sportspeople in the United States